Pop model is Belgian pop singer Lio's third studio album of entirely new material and fourth album overall. It features two of her biggest hits: "Les brunes comptent pas pour des prunes" and "Fallait pas commencer". It is her second best-selling album and was certified gold in France.

Background 
Pop model was released after the failure of her previous album, Amour toujours.
Between the two albums, Lio teamed up with French TV presenter Jacky and scored a Top 50 hit with the single "Tétèoù?", written and produced by her then-boyfriend, singer-songwriter Alain Chamfort.
According to Lio's autobiography, Alain Chamfort worked on the production of the lead single "Les brunes comptent pas pour des prunes" as a "breakup gift".

Singles

Re-Issues 
The album was originally released by the record company Polydor in 1986. It was re-released by Ze Records in 2005 with four bonus tracks, including a cover of T. Rex's "Hot Love", the English version of "Les brunes comptent pas pour des prunes" and the extended versions of many songs.

Track listing

Personnel 
 Backing vocals [additional] – Helena Noguerra
 Backing vocals, arranged by [backing vocals] – Sylvaine Bordy
 Bass – Marc Navez
 Cello – David Shamban
 Drums – Gilbert Levy, Philippe Draï (tracks: 6, 12, 14)
 Guitar – Vincent Palmer (tracks: 6, 12, 14)
 Guitar, arranged by [horns] – Yann Lecker
 Keyboards, arranged by [strings] – John Cale
 Percussion – Marcal Filho
 Producer – Alain Chamfort (tracks: 6, 12, 14), John Cale (tracks: 5, 8, 10, 18), Marc Moulin (tracks: 6, 12, 14), Michel Esteban
 Saxophone – Spider Mittleman
 Synthesizer, mixed by – Steven Stanley
 Trumpet – Dale Turner
 Viola – Peter Hatch
 Violin – Edith S. Shayne, Henri Ferber*, Michael Markman

Certifications

References 

1986 albums
Lio albums
Polydor Records albums
Warner Music Group albums
ZE Records albums
Albums produced by John Cale